Lolee Aries (April 18, 1957 – July 10, 2018) was a television producer specializing in animated series. Aries has been an executive producer of Rugrats, Hey Arnold!, King of the Hill, CatDog, Family Guy, Dora the Explorer, Invader Zim, The Fairly OddParents, Oswald, and ChalkZone, and among other shows like The Simpsons, The Angry Beavers, SpongeBob SquarePants, and The Oblongs. Aries also worked for Film Roman Inc. also as an animation executive producer.

References

External links

1957 births
2018 deaths
American television producers
Emmy Award winners
Deaths from lymphoma